Pijush Ganguly (2 January 1965 – 25 October 2015) was a noted Bengali film, television and theater actor. In 2005 he received the Bengal Film Journalists' Association Award for the Best Actor in a Supporting Role for his performance in Mahulbanir Sereng.

Life and career 
Pijush Ganguly started his career as an employee of NABARD but later moved on to pursue a career in acting. He started acting out of passion in the stages of Kolkata. He was actively involved with the Bengali Theatre scene and performed in various plays. During his career, he worked with notable thespians such as Bratya Basu, Bibhas Chakraborty, Arun Mukherjee and Ramaprasad Banik, among others.

Ganguly was a well established and popular actor in the Bengali television industry. He appeared in television programmes and films under the direction of the likes of Anjan Dutt, Kaushik Ganguly, Aparna Sen, and others.

He was a well-known face in television serials from the mid-1990s till his death in 2015. He started his television career with Abar Jakher Dhan. Some of his popular TV serials included Jol Nupur, Abar Jokher Dhon, and Amodini. He hosted the reality show Ma vs Bouma. He also acted in popular films like the drama Laptop, the mystery Byomkesh Bakshi, and the period romance Iti Srikanta.

Personal life

Pijush Ganguly was born in Balananda Hospital, Behala (Kolkata), in 1965. He resided in Behala, Kolkata. He held two bachelor's degrees, in commerce and arts from the University of Calcutta.

During his school and college days, he had been a prolific goalkeeper and may have pursued a career in the sport, if not for an accident.

He married Pamela Ganguly and has a son.
He loved painting and had a keen interest in Manna Dey's music.

Death 
Ganguly died on 25 October 2015 at 2:45am, at Belle Vue Clinic, Kolkata. He died of "multi-organ failure and fat embolism in a case polytrauma" after he met with a road accident on 20 October 2015 when his MUV collided head-on with a bus at Santragachi in Howrah district on 20 October when he was returning to the city after a show.

Filmography
 Chaar (2014) (directed by Sandip Ray)
 Basanta Utsav (2013) (directed by Rhitobrata Bhattacharya)
 Goynar Baksho (2013) (directed by Aparna Sen)
 Aborto(2013) (directed by Arindam Sil)
 Laptop (2012) (directed by Kaushik Ganguly)
 Abar Byomkesh (2012) (directed by Anjan Dutt)
 Dashami (2012) (directed by Suman Moitra)
 Autograph (film) (2010) (directed by Srijit Mukherji)
 Byomkesh Bakshi (2010) (directed by Anjan Dutt)
 Angshumaner Chhobi  (2009) (directed by Atanu Ghosh)
 Bhalobasar Onek Naam (2006)
 Madly Bangali (2004) (directed by Anjan Dutt)
 Iti Srikanta (2004) (directed by Anjan Das)
 Mahulbanir Sereng (2004) (directed by Shekhar Das)
 Baba Keno Chakar (1998) (directed by Swapan Saha)
 Matribhumi (1997) (directed by Milan Bhowmik)
 Amodini (1994) (directed by Chidananda Dasgupta)

Awards 
 1991 Pramathesh Barua Award
 1996 Shyamal Sen Smriti Samman
 2005 Bengal Film Journalists' Association Award
 2008 Sangbad Pratidin Complan Tele Samman
 2014 Government of West Bengal (Information and Cultural Affairs) Tele Academy Award
 2014 Shailajananda Smarak Chalachitra Samman

References

External links

Bengal Film Journalists' Association Award winners
Male actors in Bengali cinema
Bengali male television actors
1965 births
2015 deaths
People from Dhaka
Male actors from Kolkata
Indian male film actors
University of Calcutta alumni